Legananny (believed to be ) is a townland  north of  Leitrim, Northern Ireland. It contains the ancient Legannany Dolmen which has stood for between 4000 and 4500 years. It is made up of three large stones standing upright with a very large stone sitting on top of them. It has been linked with the Irish goddess Áine.

The townland borders four other townlands, these are: Benraw, Leitrim, Slievenaboley and Clanvaraghan. Legananny has a population of around 100 people, most of these being farmers and their families. Slieve Garran is the biggest hill in Legananny.

Townlands of County Down
Civil parish of Aghaderg
Civil parish of Drumgooland